Wolfgang Amadeus Mozart's Clarinet Concerto in A major, K. 622, was completed in October 1791 for the clarinettist Anton Stadler. It consists of three movements, in a fast–slow–fast succession.

The work was completed a few weeks before the composer's death, and has been described as his swan-song and his last great completed work. The date of its first performance is not certain, but may have been 16 October 1791 in Prague. 

The concerto was written to be played on the basset clarinet, which can play lower notes than an ordinary clarinet, but after the death of Mozart it was published with changes to the solo part to allow performance on conventional instruments. The manuscript score is lost, but from the latter part of the 20th century onwards many performances of the work have been given on basset clarinets in conjectural reconstructions of Mozart's original.

History

Anton Stadler, a close friend of Mozart, was a virtuoso clarinettist and co-inventor of the basset clarinet, an instrument with an extended range of lower notes. It went down to low (written) C, instead of stopping at (written) E as standard clarinets do. Stadler was also an expert player of the basset horn. Mozart first composed music for that instrument as early as 1783, and for the basset clarinet in 1787. The latter features in the instrumentation of Così fan tutte (1789). In early October 1791 Mozart wrote to his wife from Prague that he had completed "Stadler's rondo" – the third movement of the Clarinet Concerto. The concerto was the final major work Mozart completed; Wolfgang Hildesheimer has described it as the composer's "last instrumental work, and his last great completed work of any kind", and the critic Henri Ghéon called it Mozart's "swan-song".

There is no surviving autograph for the concerto, and the printed score was published posthumously. The only relic of the work written in Mozart's hand is an excerpt of an earlier rendition written for basset horn in G (K. 584b/621b). This excerpt, dating from late 1789, is nearly identical to the corresponding section in the published version for A clarinet, although only the melody lines are completely filled out. After rethinking the work as a basset clarinet concerto, Mozart gave the completed manuscript to Stadler in October 1791. The date of the first performance is not known for certain, but was probably on 16 October 1791 in Prague. Stadler gave a concert there on that day, but no programme survives.

Several notes throughout the piece go beyond the conventional range of the A clarinet, but the basset clarinet was a rare, custom-made instrument, and when the piece was published after Mozart's death, a new version was made by unknown arrangers, with the low notes transposed to regular range. Objections were raised to this: a reviewer in the Allgemeine musikalische Zeitung commented that although the transpositions made the work playable on normal clarinets, it would have been better to publish Mozart's original version, with the alterations printed in smaller notes as optional alternatives.

The clarinettist Alan Hacker commented in 1969 that if the original manuscript had been published, "manufacturers would have made and sold basset clarinets by the thousand", but the manuscript was lost. Mozart's widow told a publisher that Stadler had either lost it, pawned it or had it stolen from him. In 1801 three different publishing houses – André, Sieber, and Breitkopf & Härtel – published editions of the work, all with the solo part adapted for the standard clarinet. These became the standard performing editions.

The basset clarinet fell out of use after Stadler's death and no original instruments from his time have survived. The instrument was revived in the latter part of the 20th century: attempts were made to replicate the original version, and new basset clarinets have been built for the specific purpose of performing Mozart's concerto and clarinet quintet. Some have been based on 1790s engravings showing Stadler's instrument. The first performance of a reconstructed version of the original was in 1951; Jiří Kratochvíl's reconstruction was played by the clarinettist Josef Janouš.

Music
The modern scoring of the work is for solo clarinet in A, two flutes, two bassoons, two horns and strings.

I. Allegro
The concerto opens with a sonata-form movement in A major. The form of the movement is as follows:

Orchestral ritornello: bars 1–56
Solo exposition: bars 57–154
Ritornello: bars 154–171
Development: bars 172–227
Ritornello: bars 227–250
Recapitulation: bars 251–343
Ritornello: bars 343–359

The first theme begins an orchestral ritornello that is joyful and light:

It soon transforms into a flurry of sixteenth notes in descending sequence, played by the violins and flutes while the lower instruments drive the piece forward. After the medial caesura, the strings begin a series of canons before the first closing theme, featuring first and second violins, enters. The second closing theme is much more subtle until the fanfare of its final two bars. As the soloist enters, the clarinet repeats the opening theme with the expected added ornamentation. As the orchestra restates the main theme, the clarinet traverses the whole range of the instrument with several flourishes.

The secondary theme begins in the parallel minor, and eventually tonicizes C major before arriving in the dominant key, E major. At the end of the E-major section, there is a short pause, where the soloist conventionally improvises a short eingang (cadenza), although no context is offered for a true cadenza. The canonic material of the opening ritornello returns, this time involving the clarinet and leads to the novel feature of the soloist accompanying the orchestra with an Alberti bass over the first closing theme. The orchestral ritornello returns, ending with the second closing theme.

The development section explores a few new key areas including F minor and D major, and even has some hints of the Baroque. Before the formal orchestral ritornello leading into the recapitulation, Mozart writes a series of descending sequences with the cellos and bassoons holding suspensions over staccato strings.

As is conventional in Classical concerto form, in the recapitulation the soloist and orchestra are united, and the secondary theme is altered to stay in the tonic. As the secondary theme comes to a close, the clarinet has another chance to improvise briefly, and this time leads the canonic material that follows. The Alberti bass and arpeggios over diminished chords for the soloist recur before the movement ends in a cheerful final orchestral ritornello.

II. Adagio
The second movement, which is in rounded binary form (i.e. ABA'), is in D major. It opens with the soloist playing the movement's primary theme with orchestral repetition:

The B section, in which the solo part is always prominent, exploits both the chalumeau and clarion registers. The only true cadenza of the entire work occurs right at the end of the B section, immediately before the return of the A section. There are some passages that exploit the lowest notes of the basset clarinet in the B section.

III. Rondo: Allegro
The concerto ends with a movement in A major. This movement is a blend of sonata and rondo forms that Mozart developed in his piano concertos, most notably the A major Piano Concerto, K. 488. It is in A–B–A–C–A–B–A form, with the middle A's being shorter restatements of the theme, unlike regular rondo form which is ABACA.

The movement opens with a cheerful theme:

This refrain is interspersed with episodes either echoing this mood or recalling the darker colours of the first movement:

 The first A (bars 1–56) features the soloist in dialogue with the orchestra, often one phrase eliding seamlessly into the next.  In some ways the orchestra and soloist are competing with one another – the more definitive the statement made by the orchestra, the more virtuosic the response by the clarinet.
 The first B (bars 57–113) begins with a lyrical theme, and eventually features chromaticism and some very dramatic lines which feature the extended range of the basset clarinet.
 The second A (114–137) is heard again briefly, before the orchestra moves right into the closing theme of the original A section, this time employing a descending sequence and hemiola, modulating to the relative minor.
 The C section (bars 137–177), according to the musicologist Colin Lawson, contains "one of the most dramatic showcases for the basset clarinet in the entire concerto, featuring spectacular leaps, together with dialogue between soprano and baritone registers." Starting in F minor, this section eventually modulates back to A major.
 Bars 178–187 serve as the third A. By no means a full statement of the refrain, in this section Mozart sets the motif from the A section as a sequence of descending thirds leading to a stop on the dominant chord.
 The second B (bars 188–246) begins like the first but is extended and explores some different key areas. This allows the soloist frequent opportunities to display chromatic figurations, and the composer to demonstrate his creativity in the reworking of the material.
 The refrain (bars 247–301) is heard for the final time, finally in its entirety, before proceeding to the coda (bars 301–353). Here the rondo theme is developed dramatically, using the full range of the clarinet. The coda builds until a brief pause allows the solo clarinet to lead the orchestra into one more extended statement of the A theme, followed by the orchestra's now familiar closing theme of A.

Recordings 
The first recording of the concerto, made in 1929 (Brunswick Records 20076‑8), featured Haydn Draper as soloist, with an unnamed orchestra conducted by Clarence Raybould. It was followed by recordings with Luigi Amodio and François Étienne as soloists. None of these three versions is known to have survived. The first recordings of the reconstructed counterpart were made in September 1968 with the Swiss clarinettist Hans Rudolph Stalder and the Cologne Chamber Orchestra, conducted by Helmut Müller-Brühl. For this and for concert performances, Stalder had a modern Boehm basset clarinet built at the F. Arthur Uebel factory in Markneukirchen, Saxony.

The first recording using a reconstruction of a period basset clarinet was in 1973 on the EMI label with Hans Deinzer and the conductorless Collegium Aureum. Other recordings of the concerto include:

Notes, references and sources

Notes

References

Sources

Books

Journals

External links

 
 
The 1802 AMZ review of the Mozart Clarinet Concerto (German Original text with English Translation)
Clarinet Concerto KV 622, reconstruction for basset clarinet A new edition based on the three early prints, critical report and commentary.

1791 compositions
Concertos by Wolfgang Amadeus Mozart
Mozart
Compositions in A major